City Chapel London is a church in Manor Park East London. 

The church was founded and planted by Dr Jonathan and  Abbiih Oloyede, who have over 29years pastoral and ministry experience. It was founded in autumn 2008 in collaboration with friends and regional networks, and was registered with the Charity Commission for England and Wales on 13 February 2009.

In 2010, members of the church started the Newham Foodbank, which is now run by another organisation and trustees totally separate from the church. In 2011 the church registered The East London City Projects.

City Chapel is a member of the Evangelical Alliance.

References

External links
City Chapel London website

Chapels in London
Charities based in London